Keats Island is a small uninhabited island located on the Eastport Peninsula of Bonavista Bay near the community of Salvage, Newfoundland and Labrador, Canada.  The Island is a popular kayaking area due to the abundance of sea stacks and sea arches that can be found around the island.

The island takes its name from the family name of Keats who live in the Bonavista Bay areas.

See also
List of communities in Newfoundland and Labrador

Uninhabited islands of Newfoundland and Labrador